Manoel Pereira, O.P. (1625–1688) was a Roman Catholic prelate who served as Bishop of São Sebastião do Rio de Janeiro (1675–1680).

Biography
Manoel Pereira was born in Lisbon, Portugal on 22 Jan 1625 and ordained a priest in the Order of Preachers.
On 16 Nov 1676, he was appointed during the papacy of Pope Innocent XI as Bishop of São Sebastião do Rio de Janeiro.
On 10 Jan 1677, he was consecrated bishop by César d'Estrées, Bishop of Laon, with Francesco Casati, Titular Archbishop of Trapezus, and Michael Angelus Broglia, Bishop of Vercelli, serving as co-consecrators. 
He resigned in 1680. 
He died on 6 Jan 1688.

Episcopal succession

References 

17th-century Roman Catholic bishops in Brazil
Bishops appointed by Pope Innocent XI
1625 births
1688 deaths
Dominican bishops
Portuguese Roman Catholic bishops in South America
Roman Catholic bishops of São Sebastião do Rio de Janeiro